Constantin Zuckerman (born 1957) is a French historian and Professor of Byzantine studies at the  Ecole Pratique des Hautes Etudes in Paris.

Biography
Academic rank: professor. Highest degree: doctorate. Job title: The Deputy Director of the Centre for History and Civilization of Byzantium, Collège de France.

Zuckerman is the author of numerous articles about the Byzantine Empire, the Goths, the Armenians, the Huns, the Turkic peoples, the Khazars, the Magyars and the early Rus, among other peoples. In "On the Date of the Khazars' Conversion to Judaism and the Chronology of the Kings of the Rus Oleg and Igor," Zuckerman used Khazar documents (the Kievian Letter, Khazar Correspondence, and Schechter Letter) to call into question the traditional dates for early Kievan Rus leaders. In the same article he asserted that the Khazars converted to Judaism in 861, during the visit of Saint Cyril.

Bibliography

La Crimee entre Byzance et le Khaganat khazar. Ed. Constantin Zuckerman. Paris: Association des Amis du Centre d'Histoire et Civilisation de Byzance, 2006. 197 pp.
Zuckerman, Constantin. (2002) "Heraclius in 625" (Journal Article in Revue des études Byzantines)
Zuckerman, Constantin. (2002) On the Origin of the Khazar Diarchy and the Circumstances of Khazaria's Conversion to Judaism (Book Chapter in The Turks, Volume 1: Early Ages)
Zuckerman, Constantin. Les centres proto-urbains russes entre Scandinavie, Byzance et Orient / йds. M. Kazanski, A. Nercessian, C. Zuckerman (Rйalitйs Byzantines 7). - Paris, 2000. - Р. 95-120.
Zuckerman, Constantin. (2000) "Review of 'Rome and Persia at War, 502-532' by G. Greatrex" (Book Review in Revue des études Byzantines)
Zuckerman, Constantin. (1998) Two reforms of the 370s: recruiting soldiers and senators in the divided empire (Journal Article in Revue des études Byzantines )
Zuckerman, Constantin. (1988) The Reign of Constantine V in the Miracles of St. Theodore the Recruit (Journal Article in Revue des études Byzantines)
Zuckerman, Constantin. (1995) On the Date of the Khazars' Conversion to Judaism and the Chronology of the Kings of the Rus Oleg and Igor (Journal Article in Revue des études Byzantines ) 
 Цукерман. Перестройка древнейшей русской истории // У истоков русской государственности, 2007.

References

External links 
 Ephe.academia.edu: about Zuckerman and his full bibliography.

1957 births
Living people
20th-century French historians
Khazar studies
French male non-fiction writers
21st-century French historians